Trellis may refer to:

Structures
 Trellis (architecture), an architectural structure often used to support plants (especially vineyards)
 Trellis drainage pattern, a drainage system

Technology
 Trellis (graph), a special kind of graph used in computer science
 Trellis chart, a series or grid of small similar graphics or charts, allowing them to be easily compared
 Trellis modulation or trellis coded modulation, in telecommunications
 Trellis quantization, a method of improving data compression, often used in lossy video compression

People
 Jonathan Whitehead (born 1960), composer who sometimes publishes under the name "Trellis"
 Oswald Trellis (born 1935), Dean of St George's Cathedral

Other uses
 Mrs. Trellis of North Wales, a fictional radio correspondent in I'm Sorry I Haven't a Clue

See also
 Lattice (disambiguation)
 Trestle bridge, a bridge that consists of a number of short spans
 Truss, a structure typically made of five or more triangular units